William Small (13 October 1734 – 25 February 1775) was a Scottish physician and a professor of natural philosophy at the College of William and Mary in Virginia, where he became an influential mentor for Thomas Jefferson.

Early life
William Small was born in Carmyllie, Angus, Scotland, the son of a Presbyterian minister, James Small and his wife Lillias Scott, and younger brother to Dr Robert Small. He attended Dundee Grammar School, and Marischal College, University of Aberdeen where he received an MA in 1755.  In 1758, he was appointed Professor of Natural Philosophy at the College of William and Mary in Williamsburg, Virginia, then one of Britain's American colonies.

Jefferson's Professor
Small is known for being Thomas Jefferson's professor at William and Mary, and for having an influence on the young Jefferson. Small introduced him to members of Virginia society who were to have an important role in Jefferson's life, including George Wythe a leading jurist in the colonies and Francis Fauquier, the Governor of Virginia.

Recalling his years as a student, Thomas Jefferson described Small as:
a man profound in most of the useful branches of science, with a happy talent of communication, correct and gentlemanly manners, and a large and liberal mind... from his conversation I got my first views of the expansion of science and of the system of things in which we are placed.

Back in England
In 1764 Small returned to Britain, with a letter of introduction to Matthew Boulton from Benjamin Franklin. Through this connection Small helped form the Lunar Society, a prestigious club of scientists and industrialists. 

In 1765 he received his MD and established a medical practice in Birmingham, and shared a house with the physician John Ash who was the chief campaigner for the Birmingham infirmary. Small was Boulton's physician and became a close friend of Erasmus Darwin, Thomas Day, James Keir, James Watt, Anna Seward and others connected with the Lunar Society. He was one of the best-liked members of the society and an active contributor to their debates.

He helped to bring the Theatre Royal to Birmingham in 1774 and together with Ash was involved in planning and building a hospital that was not completed until 1779, as Birmingham General Hospital.

Death
Small died in Birmingham on 25 February 1775 from malaria contracted during his stay in Virginia. He is buried in St. Philip's church yard, Birmingham.

Legacy

The William Small Physical Laboratory, which houses the Physics department at the College of William & Mary, is named in his honour.

References

Walcot, Patrick A Sketch of the Life of Dr William Small and his relationship with Matthew Boulton and James Watt. 2016

Further reading 

Ganter, Herbert L.  William Small, Jefferson's Beloved Teacher William and Mary Quarterly, 3rd Ser., Vol. 4, No. 4 (Oct., 1947), pp. 505–511

1734 births
1775 deaths
Alumni of the University of Aberdeen
People educated at the High School of Dundee
Members of the Lunar Society of Birmingham
People from Birmingham, West Midlands
18th-century Scottish medical doctors
People from Angus, Scotland